Cleator Moor is a civil parish in the Borough of Copeland, Cumbria, England.  It contains 15 listed buildings that are recorded in the National Heritage List for England.  All the listed buildings are designated at Grade II, the lowest of the three grades, which is applied to "buildings of national importance and special interest".  The parish contains the villages of Cleator Moor and Cleator, and the surrounding countryside.  The listed buildings include churches and associated structures, houses and associated structures, shops, a bank, civic buildings including offices and a library, and a memorial fountain.


Buildings

References

Citations

Sources

Lists of listed buildings in Cumbria
Listed buildings in